Ragini MMS: Returns is an Indian found footage erotic horror web series produced under ALTBalaji. The series is the third installment of Ragini MMS Franchise.

The first season starred Karishma Sharma, Riya Sen and Siddharth Gupta. It premiered on ALTBalaji and ZEE5 on 19 October 2017. The second season stars Sunny Leone, Divya Agarwal, Varun Sood in the leading roles. The show released on 18 December 2019. It is directed by Suyash Vadhavkar, Shahriyar Afsan Ovro and produced by Ekta Kapoor and Shobha Kapoor.

Plot 
Season 1

The story revolves around the life of Simran (Riya Sen), and Ragini (Karishma Sharma). The uncanny haunting that they witness at an old deserted college is at the heart of this story. Running behind the scandalous MMS CD, which has thrilling mysteries and dark secrets to unwind, is what awaits the two in search to fight the freakish energy that surrounds them.

Season 2

Meena, a paranormal investigator arrives in India from Canada. She visits the Victoria Villa which that is said to have been haunted by the ghost of Captain Burns. Meena along with her boyfriend, Rajeev gets killed by the ghost. Eleven years later, Ragini and her friends decide to celebrate their friends Bachelorette party in the Victoria Villa!

Cast 
Season 1

Karishma Sharma as Ragini
Siddharth Gupta as Rahul
Riya Sen as Simran
 Nishant Singh Malkani as Raj
 Dilnaz Irani as Kavita
 Shreya Gupto as Zoya
 Katie Iqbal as Sonia Sehgal
 Harssh A. Singh as Principal Rajat Kapoor
 Raquib Arshad as Anshuman and Old woman
 A. R. Rama as Chowkidar Raju
 Deepak Kalra as Shakti
 Sakshi Pradhan as Simon
Rakshanda Khan as Bharati Varma
Priyanka Bora as Aarti

Season 2

 Divya Agarwal as Ragini
 Varun Sood as Rahul
 Sunny Leone as Meena
 Navneet Kaur as Kirti
 Thea Dsouza as Random Ranbu
 Aarti Khetarpal as Kamna
 Mohit Duseja as Virgin Mohite
 Rakshanda Khan as Bharti Verma
 Antara Banerjee as Kasturi
 Hiten Paintal as Veer Pratap Singh
 Navdeep as Rajeev
 Sneha Namanadi as Varsha
 Rishika Nag as Aradhana
 Aadya Gupta as Sunny
 Gaurav Alugh as Harshit
 Kunal Thakur
 Vikram Rathod

Guest
 Sunny Leone Special appearance in the song "Hello Ji!" and First Episode of Season 2

Episodes

Season 1

Season 2

Soundtrack

Sequel
A sequel to the web series, Ragini MMS Returns 2 which was released on ALTBalaji and ZEE5 app in 2019.

References

External links
Ragini MMS: Returns on ALTBalaji (season 1 and 2)
Ragini MMS: Returns on ZEE5 (season 2)

2017 web series debuts
Hindi-language web series
ALTBalaji original programming
Horror fiction web series